Félicien Du Bois (born 18 October 1983) is a Swiss former professional ice hockey defenceman who spent his whole career in the National League (NL).

He currently serves as a color commentator for hockey games on the Swiss francophone TV station, RTS.

Playing career
Du Bois joined Davos from the 2014–15 season on a four-year contract after spending the previous six seasons with the Kloten Flyers.

On November 15, 2020, Du Bois announced that he would retire from professional hockey at the conclusion of the 2020-21 season.

International play
He made his international debut at the 2009 IIHF World Championship and has participated at the 2010, 2011, 2012, 2015 and 2016 as a member of the Switzerland men's national ice hockey team.

Career statistics

Regular season and playoffs

International

References

External links

1983 births
Living people
Swiss ice hockey defencemen
HC Ambrì-Piotta players
HC Davos players
EHC Kloten players
People from Neuchâtel
Ice hockey players at the 2018 Winter Olympics
Olympic ice hockey players of Switzerland
Sportspeople from the canton of Neuchâtel